Casa Barranca, more commonly referred to as Charles M. Pratt House,  near Ojai, California is a historic Arts and Crafts-style house that was built in 1909 as a winter home for industrialist Charles Millard Pratt. It is one of the "ultimate bungalows" designed by architects Charles and Henry Greene of Greene and Greene.

It is a unique house, built for a client with "unlimited resources" in a rural location that allowed the architects to place the house "in a truly natural setting";  this "was the fulfillment of a lifelong interest of the architects."  With the building site chosen within the original 14 acre parcel, an adjacent 38-acre parcel was purchased to preserve "the all important viewshed to which the house is directed."  The combination of factors allowed the work to be created very consistently with intended principles of the Arts and Crafts movement. The structure and cladding of the building are almost completely honest and devoid of mannered veneers and false beams contained in the other "ultimate bungalows".  It was listed on the National Register of Historic Places in 2002.  As of the listing, the house and views are perfectly preserved.

The Pratts partially owned the nearby Foothills Hotel, which they could use for entertaining, so "they only needed the house to serve as “sleeping quarters” and family relaxation."

See also
National Register of Historic Places listings in Ventura County, California
 Ventura County Historic Landmarks & Points of Interest

References

Houses in Ventura County, California
Ojai, California
Houses completed in 1909
Houses on the National Register of Historic Places in California
National Register of Historic Places in Ventura County, California
Arts and Crafts architecture in California
American Craftsman architecture in California
Bungalow architecture in California
Greene and Greene buildings